Auglaize County Neil Armstrong Airport  is a public use airport located in New Knoxville, Ohio, eight nautical miles (9 mi, 15 km) southwest of the central business district of Wapakoneta, Ohio. It is owned by the Auglaize County Airport Authority. This airport is included in the National Plan of Integrated Airport Systems for 2019–2023, which categorizes it as a general aviation facility. 

Nearby Wapakoneta is the birthplace of Neil Armstrong, aviator, astronaut and first person to walk on the Moon.

Facilities and aircraft 
Auglaize County Neil Armstrong Airport covers an area of 140 acres (57 ha) at an elevation of 913 feet (278 m) above mean sea level. It has one runway, Runway 08/26, which is 5,500 by 100 feet (1,676 x 30 m) with an asphalt surface.

For the 12-month period ending May 8, 2018, the airport had 9,805 aircraft operations, an average of 27 per day: 82% general aviation, 18% air taxi, and <1% military. At that time there were 31 aircraft based at this airport: 84% single-engine and 16% jet.

References

External links 
 Auglaize County Neil Armstrong Airport
 Airport page  at Auglaize County website
 Aerial image as of April 1994 from USGS The National Map
 

Airports in Ohio
Transportation in Auglaize County, Ohio
Neil Armstrong